B-And-B is a British television sitcom starring Bernard Braden, his wife Barbara Kelly and their daughter Kim Braden. It was written by Michael Pertwee, and aired for a pilot and one series in 1968.

Cast
Bernard Braden – Bernie
Barbara Kelly – Barbara
Kim Braden – Sally
Mark Griffith – Johnny
Pauline Collins – Chantal (pilot)

Plot
This domestic sitcom stars married couple Bernard Braden and Barbara Kelly as a married couple who both have successful showbusiness careers, and clearly there was an ounce of realism in the programme. In the pilot, Bernie falls for Chantal, their French au pair. Bernie thinks his wife is having an affair, they both think their children are taking drugs and in the final episode the couple contemplate divorce.

Episodes

Pilot (1968)
Pilot (7 June 1968) (part of Comedy Playhouse)

Series One (1968)
"No Son of Mine" (13 November 1968)
Episode Two (20 November 1968)
Episode Three (27 November 1968)
Episode Four (4 December 1968)
"Come to the Aid of the Party"  (11 December 1968)
"Pryde and Prejudice" (18 December 1968)

References
Mark Lewisohn, "Radio Times Guide to TV Comedy", BBC Worldwide Ltd, 2003
British TV Comedy Guide for B-And-B

External links

1968 British television series debuts
1968 British television series endings
1960s British sitcoms
BBC television sitcoms
Comedy Playhouse
Lost BBC episodes